The 1956 Arkansas gubernatorial election was held on November 6, 1956.

Incumbent Democratic Governor Orval Faubus won election to a second term, defeating Republican nominee Roy Mitchell with 80.65% of the vote.

Primary elections
Primary elections were held on July 31, 1956. By winning over 50% of the vote, Faubus avoided a run-off which would have been held on August 14, 1956.

Democratic primary

Candidates
Orval Faubus, incumbent Governor
James D. "Justice Jim" Johnson, lawyer, State Senator and leader of the Citizens' Councils
Ben F. Pippin, retired businessman
S. K. "Stew" Prosser, former U.S. Marine and state agency executive
Jim Snoddy, former State Senator

Results

General election

Candidates
Orval Faubus, Democratic
Roy Mitchell, Republican

Results

References

Bibliography
 

1956
Arkansas
Gubernatorial
November 1956 events in the United States